The Eurêka! Festival is a Montreal-based festival which aims to popularize science amongst young people and their families. The event is typically held outdoors, over a three-day period. Produced by L’île du savoir in collaboration with numerous partners, the Eurêka! Festival offers festivalgoers a wide variety of free interactive activities and the opportunity to meet and exchange with local professionals in STEM (science, technology, engineering and mathematics).

Description 
The first day of the Eurêka! Festival is dedicated to schoolkids and their teachers while the weekend is for families.  The Eurêka! Festival shares and promotes scientific knowledge and aims to motivate the next generation to pursue studies and careers in STEM fields.

The Eureka! Festival also serves to mobilize Quebec’s science community on an annual basis, bringing together in one location some sixty organizations, universities, companies and institutions to offer over a hundred exploratory activities in a variety of fields. Shows, conferences, workshops, demonstrations, and short educational experiments create connections between scientists and the young public, encouraging kids to apply critical thinking and to have a better understanding of the world around them, all in a very festive atmosphere! 

Topics covered at the Festival include climate change, technological innovations, mobility of the future, technological arts, aerospace, engineering, artificial intelligence, fauna and flora, health sciences and the human body, etc...

History 
In 2007, the Conférence Régionale des Élus (CRÉ) de Montréal, with joint funding from the Government of Quebec, established an extensive operation to promote science and technology to young people on the Island of Montreal. Out of this initiative was born the Eurêka! Festival.

From its very first edition that drew 43,000 festivalgoers, the Eurêka! Festival has named a local scientist as a spokesperson (Paul Houde in 2007). Since then, the annual event has been embraced by educators and families and has gained substantially in popularity. Initiatives such as the “Science Goes to School” contest and the “Elles-Innov” project, which supports and rewards young female innovators, are developed to extend the Eurêka! experience.

Since 2014, the Eurêka! Festival hosts a special edition of the science gameshow, Genial! in partnership with Télé-Québec. 

L'île du savoir, a non-profit organization dedicated to designing projects to develop young people's interest in science and technology, has become the supporting organization for the Eurêka! Festival.

Year after year, the number of visitors has continued to increase, culminating with a record 142,000 visitors in 2019. 

After the cancellation of the 2020 edition due to the COVID-19 pandemic, the Eurêka! Festival returned in 2021 with a hybrid edition, consisting of 2 different components: the Archipel virtuel, a fun and educational digital platform and a Eurêka! School Tour in Montreal schools. The 2022 in-person edition of the Eurêka! Festival will be held at Parc Jean-Drapeau.

Come celebrate the Eurêka Festival's 16th anniversary and this edition’s theme: Energy. May 26, 27 and 28, 2023, located at the foot of the Biosphère in the heart of Parc Jean-Drapeau.

Editions 
Starting in 2013, each edition of the Eureka! Festival has focused on a theme that echoes current events in the field of science.
 2007: 1st edition
 2008: 2nd edition
 2009: 3rd edition
 2010: 4th edition
 2011: 5th edition
 2012: 6th edition
 2013: 7th edition – Science and comedy
 2014: 8th edition – Machines 
 2015: 9th edition – Play 
 2016: 10th edition – Exploits
 2017: 11th edition – Dreams
 2018: 12th edition – Robotics and Artificial Intelligence
 2019: 13th edition – Transportation of the future
 2020: 14th edition – cancelled due to COVID-19 pandemic
 2021: 14th edition – Hybrid edition with 2 components: a digital platform and a School Tour
 2022: 15th edition – Water in all its states
 2023: 16th edition – Energy

Spokespersons 
 Paul Houde – Inaugural edition, 2007
 Marc-Andé Coallier – 2008 to 2011
 Stéphane Bellavance –2012 to 2014
 Martin Carli –2015 to 2017
 Stéphane Bellavance & Martin Carli – spokesperson duo since 2018
 Stéphane Bellavance –2022

Awards and recognition 
 2014 – Finalist for the ESTim award for an Innovative or Public/Parapublic Development Project, awarded by the East Montreal Chamber of Commerce
 2013 – Best Program Award from the Canadian Association of Science Centres (CASC) 
 2012 – Finalist, Festivals and Tourism Events (budget over $1M), Quebec Tourism Awards
 2010 – Finalist in the Best Festival category, Quebec Tourism Awards 
 2009 – Finalist in the Best Festival category, Quebec Tourism Awards  
 2008 – Technoscience Innovation Award from the Quebec Association for Industrial Research (ADRIQ)

References

External links 
 L’île du savoir

Science festivals
Festivals in Montreal